Ayn al-Niser (also spelled Ain al-Nisr or Ayni-Nasir) is a town in central Syria, administratively part of the Homs Governorate, located northeast of Homs. Nearby localities include al-Mishirfeh to the west, Ayn al-Dananir to the northwest, Izz al-Din to the north, al-Mukharram al-Fawqani to the east and Umm al-Amad to the southeast.

According to the Central Bureau of Statistics (CBS), Ayn al-Niser had a population of 604 in the 2004 census. It is the administrative center and 11th largest locality of the Ayn al-Niser nahiyah ("subdistrict") which consists of 16 localities with a collective population of 30,267. The inhabitants of the village are ethnic Circassians from the Shapsugh, Kabardian and Bzhedug tribes.

References

Populated places in Homs District
Towns in Syria
Circassian communities in Syria